SS Benjamin Chew was a Liberty ship built in the United States during World War II. She was named after Benjamin Chew, a fifth-generation American, a Quaker-born legal scholar, a prominent and successful Philadelphia lawyer, head of the Pennsylvania Judiciary System under both Colony and Commonwealth, and Chief Justice of the Supreme Court of the Province of Pennsylvania. Chew was well known for his precision and brevity in making legal arguments as well as his excellent memory, judgment, and knowledge of statutory law. Chew lived and practiced law in Philadelphia, four blocks from Independence Hall, and provided pro bono his knowledge of substantive law to America's Founding Fathers during the creation of the United States Constitution and Bill of Rights.

Construction
Benjamin Chew was laid down on 15 June 1942, under a Maritime Commission (MARCOM) contract, MCE hull 58, by the Bethlehem-Fairfield Shipyard, Baltimore, Maryland; she was sponsored by Mrs. Andrew L. Jorgensen, the wife of a yard employee, and was launched on 10 August 1942.

History
She was allocated to Calmar Steamship Company, on 21 August 1942.

On 20 May 1948, she was laid up in the National Defense Reserve Fleet, Astoria, Oregon. On 2 June 1952, she was laid up in the National Defense Reserve Fleet, Wilmington, North Carolina. On 27 November 1954, she was withdrawn from the fleet for test conversion to steam turbine power. Ira S. Bushey & Sons, Inc., Brooklyn, New York, performed the conversion and she was reclassified EC2-S-8a. She had her reciprocating steam engine removed and a  steam turbine, connected directly to the ship's propeller through double reduction gear, installed. At trials she ran above the requested .

After conversion she was transferred to the Military Sea Transportation Service (MSTS). She was operated by United States Lines under a bareboat charter on the same route as another converted Liberty ship, . Thomas Nelson had been refit with diesel engines in order to compare efficiencies of various conversions. While both ship were able to run on Bunker C fuel oil, Thomas Nelson consumed less than half of Benjamin Chew while traveling at a higher speed and carrying more cargo.

On 31 October 1958, she was laid up in the James River Reserve Fleet, Lee Hall, Virginia. She was removed from the fleet on 3 September 1966, for use by the MSTS. On 21 July 1969, she was laid up in the National Defense Reserve Fleet, Mobile, Alabama. She was sold for scrapping on 28 October 1971, to Union Minerals & Alloys Corp., along with three other ships, for $127,500. She was removed from the fleet, 8 February 1972.

References

Bibliography

 
 
 
 
 

 

Liberty ships
1942 ships
Ships built in Baltimore
Astoria Reserve Fleet
Wilmington Reserve Fleet
James River Reserve Fleet
Mobile Reserve Fleet